Unquillosaurus (meaning "Unquillo river lizard") is a genus of possible maniraptoran or carnosaurian theropod dinosaur from the Late Cretaceous Los Blanquitos Formation of Salta Province, Argentina. The genus contains a single species, U. ceibalii, known only from a single fossilized pubis (a pelvic bone).

Discovery and naming 
The holotype, PVL 3670-11, was found at Arroyo-Morterito in the Los Blanquitos Formation, dating to the Campanian. The specimen was re-studied by Fernando Novas and Federico Agnolin in 2004, who concluded that the orientation of the pubis had been misinterpreted: it pointed backwards, as was shown by the fossil still being attached to a displaced part of the pubic peduncle of the ilium.

The type species Unquillosaurus ceibalii was described by Jaime Eduardo Powell in 1979. The generic name, "Unquillosaurus," is derived from the river Unquillo and the Greek word, "sauros," meaning "lizard." The specific name, "ceibalii," refers to the town El Ceibal.

Classification 
Powell originally assigned Unquillosaurus to the Carnosauria in 1986. In 2004, Novas and Agnolin concluded from the opisthopubic pelvic anatomy that Unquillosaurus was part of the Maniraptora or at least Maniraptoriformes, and likely closely related to either the Avialae or the bird-like Alvarezsauridae; perhaps it was itself a bird, a basal member of the Metornithes. In 2006 however, Novas stated that Unquillosaurus probably belonged to the maniraptoran clade Dromaeosauridae. Carrano et al. in 2012, placed the animal back in Carnosauria, specifically Carcharodontosauria, noting that the original interpretation was likely correct and that the animal has many similarities to Giganotosaurus.

Description 

Paleoecology 
Unquillosaurus is known from the Los Blanquitos Formation. The abelisaurid theropod Guemesia is also known from this formation, as well as fossils of what may belong to a species of Titanosaurus.

See also 

 Timeline of dromaeosaurid research

References 

Prehistoric tetanurans
Campanian life
Late Cretaceous dinosaurs of South America
Cretaceous Argentina
Fossils of Argentina
Salta Basin
Fossil taxa described in 1979
Taxa named by Jaime Powell